ACMI may refer to:
 A Certain Magical Index, a Japanese light novel series
 Air Combat Maneuvering Instrumentation, a set of systems that record an aircraft's in-flight data during weapon range operations
 American College of Medical Informatics, a college of elected fellows who have made significant and sustained contributions to the field of medical informatics
 Australian Centre for the Moving Image, an Australian institution dedicated to the moving image in all its forms
 Art & Creative Materials Institute, Inc., an industry trade group composed of companies that manufacture art materials
 Aircraft, Crew, Maintenance and Insurance, a type of lease contract used in aviation, more commonly known as a Wet lease